General elections were held in Bahrain on 24 October 2002 to elect the forty members of the Council of Representatives. They were the second general elections in the country's history, and the first since the dissolution of the 1973 National Assembly. 

The elections were the first to be held under the 2002 constitution, with voter turnout reported to be 53.2%. For the first time, women had the right to vote and the right to stand in national elections.

Campaign
The elections were boycotted by Al Wefaq, the country's largest political party, as well as the National Democratic Action Society, the Nationalist Democratic Rally Society, and Islamic Action Society. They claimed that the 2002 constitution gave too much power to the unelected Consultative Council, and demanded a reform of the constitution.

Results

Although all candidates ran as independents due to the ban on political parties, six political societies gained representation in the Council of Representatives. The Islamic Forum and al Asalah both won six seats, Rabita al-Islami won three seats, the Shura Society and the National Democratic Assembly both won two seats, whilst al Meethaq won one.

References

External links
2002 Bahrain election results Psephos

Elections in Bahrain
Bahrain
2002 in Bahrain
National Assembly (Bahrain)